Lacey Waldrop (born March 6, 1993) is an American, former collegiate All-American professional softball pitcher and current assistant coach at Houston. Waldrop was a starting pitcher for Florida State, where she is the school career leader in wins and was named USA Softball Collegiate Player of the Year in 2014. Waldrop was drafted third overall in the 2015 NPF Draft by the Chicago Bandits, and won two consecutive Cowles Cup championships with the Bandits in 2015 and 2016.

Playing career
Born in Chester, Virginia, she attended Thomas Dale High School, where she made the all-state softball team as a senior in 2011, and was named Player of the Week by the Richmond Times-Dispatch.

Waldrop studied at and played for Florida State University from 2012 to 2015, earning significant recognition, including winning seven All-Atlantic Coast Conference (ACC) honors, three All-American honors, and a tryout invitation for Team USA. In 2014, the Amateur Softball Association and USA Softball named Waldrop the USA Softball Collegiate Player of the Year. She also won ACC Pitcher of the Year in both 2014 and 2015.

Waldrop graduated with a bachelor's degree in Editing, Writing, and Media, with a minor in Communications. During her time at Florida State, she was recognized for her academic achievements.

After graduating, Waldrop was drafted third overall by the Chicago Bandits in the 2015 NPF Draft. She went on to win consecutive Cowles Cup with the Bandits in 2015 and 2016.

Coaching career
On July 6, 2017, Waldrop was named assistant coach at Duke.

On July 17, 2020, Waldrop was named assistant coach at Houston.

Career statistics

References

Further reading

External links
 
Lacey Waldrop Bio

1993 births
Living people
Florida State Seminoles softball players
Duke Blue Devils softball coaches
Oklahoma Sooners softball coaches
Chicago Bandits players
People from Chester, Virginia
Sportspeople from Virginia
Softball players from Virginia
Softball coaches from Virginia
American softball coaches
Female sports coaches